Markets in Sydney offer an extensive range of produce and both new and second-hand merchandise. There are both outdoor and covered markets in Sydney, Australia.

City (Central Sydney)

Sydney suburbs

Gallery

References

External links 
 MarketsAndStallholders.com
 MarketsAndStallholders.com — Markets open today
 Sydney's Markets — Discover Sydney
 Sydney Markets — Markets Online
 Sydney Markets — You.com.au

Markets in Sydney, List of
Sydney, List of markets in
Markets
Sydney